Perry Tian Hee Ng (born 27 April 1996) is an English professional footballer who plays as a defender for Championship club Cardiff City. 

Ng made his professional debut for Crewe Alexandra in 2015, after a loan at Hyde United, and made 182 appearances for Crewe before joining Cardiff in January 2021.

Club career

Crewe Alexandra
Born in Liverpool, Ng was in Crewe Alexandra's youth system for ten years before signing his first professional contract for two years on 14 May 2014. On 1 November 2014, he had his first inclusion in a matchday squad, remaining an unused substitute in a 1–1 draw at Crawley Town in League One.

On 30 January 2015, Ng was loaned for a month to Hyde United of the Conference North. He made his senior debut on 7 February, playing the full 90 minutes of a 1–3 home loss to Boston United. Ng twice extended his loan for the struggling team, eventually for the remainder of the season. He totalled 13 appearances, all starts, as they ended the season bottom of the table, and scored his first senior goal on 14 March, a last-minute equaliser in a 1–1 draw with Harrogate Town at Ewen Fields.

On 27 November 2015, Ng made his debut for Crewe, coming on in added time in place of Ryan Colclough in a 1–0 win over Oldham Athletic at Gresty Road. He made Crewe's starting XI for the first time on 5 May 2016 against Burton Albion at Gresty Road.

On 22 May 2017, Ng signed a new one-year deal, including an option for a further 12 months depending on appearances. He was sent off for two bookings in 17 minutes on 12 August in a 1–1 home draw with Newport County. Four weeks later, on 9 September 2017, he scored his first Crewe goal in a 5–1 win over Chesterfield at Gresty Road.

On 3 January 2018, Ng was retrospectively suspended for four games following an off-the-ball clash with Cambridge United's Jabo Ibehre in a match at the Abbey Stadium on 30 December 2017. Ng's left-footed strike at Stevenage on 10 March 2018 was named the League Two Goal of the Month winner for March.

Ng was Crewe's Player of the Year and Players' Player of the Year for 2018–19, with manager David Artell praising his consistency despite not scoring a goal all season. The following season (2019–20), Ng helped Crewe to automatic promotion to EFL League One in a campaign shortened due to the COVID-19 pandemic, and was widely selected by regional football journalists in their "League Two team of the season (so far)". In September 2020, he (along with Crewe team-mate Charlie Kirk) was named in the PFA League Two Team of the Year for the 2019–20 season.

Ng was suspended for six matches following a breach of FA Rule E1 (spitting) after an FA Cup tie at Cheltenham Town on 28 November 2020.

Cardiff City
In early January 2021, Artell rejected an initial offer for Ng, reportedly £250,000, from Championship side Cardiff City. On 19 January, the transfer, for an undisclosed fee, was confirmed; the BBC reported Cardiff would pay Crewe an initial £350,000, which could rise to £500,000, and would keep the player until the summer of 2024. He made his debut the next day in a 1–0 home defeat against Queens Park Rangers.

Ng was sent off after receiving two yellow cards in Cardiff's opening game of the 2022–23 season, a 1–0 home victory against Norwich City on 30 July 2022. He scored his first goal for the club on 13 September in a 3–2 win at Middlesbrough. In December 2022, Blackpool striker Gary Madine was accused of deliberately stamping on Ng, but faced no FA action as he had been cautioned by the referee. On 4 March 2023, after Cardiff goalkeeper Ryan Allsop was sent off in the 90th minute of their match against Bristol City, Ng took over in goal for the final minutes, keeping a clean sheet.

International career
Ng is eligible for the Singapore national football team through his paternal grandfather. He told FourFourTwo in May 2017 that he wanted to represent them and had been contacted by the Football Association of Singapore.

Career statistics

Honours
Individual
PFA Team of the Year: 2019–20 League Two
Crewe Alexandra Player of the Year: 2018–19

References

External links

1996 births
Living people
Footballers from Liverpool
English footballers
Association football defenders
Crewe Alexandra F.C. players
Hyde United F.C. players
Cardiff City F.C. players 
National League (English football) players
English Football League players
English people of Singaporean descent
British Asian footballers
Outfield association footballers who played in goal